John E. Worthen Arena is an arena on the campus of Ball State University in Muncie, Indiana, United States. The arena opened in 1992  and replaced Irving Gymnasium. Originally named Ball State Arena or University Arena, it was renamed Worthen Arena in honor of the former university president, John E. Worthen. The arena mainly serves as home to four Ball State Cardinals athletic teams: men's and women's basketball and men's and women's volleyball.  The seating capacity is listed at 11,500 people and cost $8 million to build.

Worthen Arena is also the site of other events, including concerts (seating capacity 11,500 end-stage, 8,800 270 degree end-stage, 7,200 180-degree end-stage, and 5,500 half-house), trade shows ( of space on the arena floor) and other special events. It features eight permanent and six portable concession stands, two permanent souvenir stands, a press room, two loading docks, and an arena lounge.

Upgrades
In 2015, a new Daktronics six-panel video board was installed above center court, as well as new scoreboards in the corners of the court. The upgrades were capped off with an upgraded court.

See also
 List of NCAA Division I basketball arenas

References

External links
Official Site

College basketball venues in the United States
Ball State Cardinals basketball
Basketball venues in Indiana
Indoor arenas in Indiana
Buildings and structures in Muncie, Indiana
Tourist attractions in Muncie, Indiana
Volleyball venues in Indiana
1992 establishments in Indiana
College volleyball venues in the United States
Sports venues completed in 1992